Admiral Mikhail Petrovich Lazarev (3 November 1788 – 11 April 1851) was a Russian fleet commander and an explorer.

Education and early career
Lazarev was born in Vladimir, a scion of the old Russian nobility from the Vladimir province. In 1800, he enrolled in Russia's Naval College. Three years later he was sent to the British Royal Navy, where he would stay for a continuous five-year navigation. From 1808 to 1813, Lazarev served in the Baltic Fleet. He took part in the Russo-Swedish War of 1808–1809 and Patriotic War of 1812.

Career as an explorer
Lazarev first circumnavigated the globe in 1813–1816, aboard the vessel Suvorov; the expedition began at Kronstadt and reached Alaska. During this voyage, Lazarev discovered the Suvorov Atoll.

As a commander of the ship  and Fabian Gottlieb von Bellingshausen's deputy on his world cruise in 1819–1821 (Bellingshausen commanded ), Lazarev took part in the discovery of Antarctica and numerous islands.  On 28 January 1820 the expedition discovered the Antarctic mainland, approaching the Antarctic coast at the coordinates  and seeing ice-fields there.

In 1822–1825, Lazarev circumnavigated the globe for the third time on his frigate Kreyser, conducting broad research in the fields of meteorology and ethnography.

Wartime commands
In 1826, Lazarev became commander of the ship , which would sail to the Mediterranean Sea as the flagship of the First Mediterranean Squadron under command of Admiral Login Petrovich Geiden and participated in the Battle of Navarino in 1827. Lazarev received the rank of rear admiral for his excellence during the battle.

In 1828–1829, he was in charge of the Dardanelles blockade. In 1830, Lazarev returned to Kronstadt and became a commander of naval units of the Baltic Fleet.  Two years later, he was made Chief of Staff of the Black Sea Fleet. In February–June 1833, Lazarev led a Russian squadron to the Bosporus and signed the Treaty of Hünkâr İskelesi with the Ottoman Empire. In 1833, Lazarev was appointed Commander of the Black Sea Fleet, the Black Sea ports, and also military governor of Sevastopol and Nikolayev.

Influence and legacy
Admiral Lazarev exercised great influence both in technical matters and as a mentor to younger officers.  He advocated the building of a steam-powered fleet, but Russia's technical and economic backwardness hindered his plans.  He tutored a number of Russian fleet commanders, including Pavel Nakhimov (1802-1855), Vladimir Alexeyevich Kornilov (1806-1854), Vladimir Istomin (1810-1855), and Grigory Butakov (1820-1882).

An atoll in the Pacific Ocean,  capes in the Amur Liman and on the Unimak Island, a former island in the Aral Sea, a bay and a port in the Sea of Japan, bay and sea in the South Ocean, a settlement near Sochi and other locations bear Lazarev's name.

Russian and Soviet navies had ships named after the admiral:
 , a monitor of the Imperial Russian Navy built in 1867 and lead ship of her class
 A light cruiser ordered for the Imperial Russian Navy in 1914, completed and renamed  after the Russian Revolution of 1917
 , a  built in the early 1950s
 The  , renamed Admiral Lazarev after the 1991 dissolution of the Soviet Union

Lazarev is buried with his disciples Nakhimov, Kornilov and Istomin in the Admirals' Burial Vault in Sevastopol. A minor planet 3660 Lazarev, discovered by Soviet astronomer Nikolai Stepanovich Chernykh in 1978, is named after him.

Honours and awards
 Order of St. George, IV class
 Order of St. Vladimir, 1st class
 Order of St. Alexander Nevsky
 Order of White Eagle
 Companion of the Order of the Bath (United Kingdom)
 Military Order of St. Louis (France)

References and notes

External links

 A map of his Antarctic expedition (in Russian), attention – all dates there are Julian

1788 births
1851 deaths
People from Vladimir, Russia
Explorers from the Russian Empire
Explorers of Antarctica
Russian nobility
Russian and Soviet polar explorers
Imperial Russian Navy admirals
Recipients of the Order of St. Vladimir, 1st class
Companions of the Order of the Bath
Order of Saint Louis recipients
War Governors of Nikolayev and Sevastopol
Recipients of the Order of the White Eagle (Poland)